A list of films produced in Azerbaijan SSR ordered by year of release in the 1920s:

Films:1918–1990 see also List of Soviet films

1923-

External links
 Azerbaijani film at the Internet Movie Database
 Azerbaycan Kinosu

1920
Lists of 1920s films
Films